Ginimellagaha is a village in Galle District, Sri Lanka, 16 km from Galle located within Baddegama divisional secretary area

References

Populated places in Galle District